The Comunidade Intermunicipal do Douro is an administrative division in Portugal. It replaced the Comunidade Urbana do Douro, created in 2004. It takes its name from the Douro River. The seat of the intermunicipal community is Vila Real. Douro comprises parts of the former districts of Bragança, Guarda, Vila Real and Viseu.

Douro is also a NUTS3 subregion of Norte Region. Since January 2015, the NUTS 3 subregion covers the same area as the intermunicipal community.

Its economic activity is largely centered on the production of wine, particularly port, and also non-fortified Douro wine from the Douro DOC wine region. The entire region is mountainous and crossed by steep valleys.

Municipalities
The CIM Douro is composed of 19 municipalities:

Geography

The main rivers are Douro River, Corgo River, Tua River and Sabor River. There is an airport at Vila Real: Aerodromo de Vila Real/Douro [VRL]. The Douro railway line was completed in 1887. The narrow gauge branch lines in the area (such as the Corgo line) are now all closed.

The main monuments are the cathedral and Mateus Palace in Vila Real, and the Remedios and Sé/cathedral in Lamego. The Alto Douro Wine Region  and the Prehistoric Rock-Art Site of the Côa Valley are both classified by UNESCO as heritage sites.

The University of Trás-os-Montes and Alto Douro is situated in Vila Real.

References

External links
Official website CIM Douro

Intermunicipal communities of Portugal
Norte Region, Portugal